Indian Creek is a stream in the U.S. state of Tennessee. It is a tributary to the Tennessee River.

Indian Creek was named for the Native American Indians of the area.

References

Rivers of Hardin County, Tennessee
Rivers of Wayne County, Tennessee
Rivers of Tennessee